Thomas Wright (29 April 1842 – date of death unknown) was an English cricketer. Wright was a right-handed batsman who bowled right-arm roundarm slow-medium. He was born at Willington, Derbyshire.

Wright made his first-class debut for Nottinghamshire against Yorkshire in 1868 at the Dewsbury and Savile Ground. He made eight further first-class appearances for the county, the last of which came against Yorkshire in 1874. In his nine first-class matches, Wright scored a total of 138 runs at an average of 9.20, with a high score of 25.

References

External links
Thomas Wright at ESPNcricinfo
Thomas Wright at CricketArchive

1842 births
Year of death unknown
People from Willington, Derbyshire
Cricketers from Derbyshire
English cricketers
Nottinghamshire cricketers